The Slovenian Cycling Federation or KZS (in Slovenian: Kolesarska Zveza Slovenije) is the national governing body of cycle racing in Slovenia.

The KZS is a member of the UCI and the UEC.

External links
 Slovenian Cycling Federation official website

Cycle racing organizations
C
Cycle racing in Slovenia